Carter Milliken Reum (born February 5, 1981) is an American author, entrepreneur and venture capitalist. He is most notable for being married to Paris Hilton, and also for founding M13 Ventures, an angel investment firm.

Career 
Along with his brother Courtney, Reum co-founded the alcohol brand VEEV Spirits, a company listed in Inc. Magazine's 5000 fastest growing private companies in the United States.

Reum was featured in episodes of the television series Hatched and has appeared as a guest and a commentator on a variety of networks including CBS and Fox. He is a contributing writer for Huffington Post and Inc. He is the co-founder of the investment firm M13.

Publications 
In 2018, Random House and Penguin Books released Shortcut Your Startup: Ten Ways to Speed Up Entrepreneurial Success. Reum co-authored the book with his brother Courtney. The book uses the Reums' experiences to teach entrepreneurs how to reach their goals. They pull from their experiences creating Veev and from the lessons learned through the years investing in companies like SpaceX, Lyft, Pinterest and Warby Parker.

In 2016, Reum started the venture capital firm M13 Investments.

Personal life 
His father, Robert Reum, was chairman, president and chief executive officer of Chicago-based Amsted Industries, ranked one of United States's largest private companies by Forbes.

Reum graduated from Columbia College of Columbia University in 2003, as did his brother Courtney and sister Halle, who is married to Oliver Hammond, a scion of the Annenberg family.  Reum is an alumnus of Zeta Beta Tau fraternity, initiated into its Delta Chapter at Columbia University.

On February 17, 2021, Reum and Paris Hilton announced their engagement. They married in Los Angeles on November 11, 2021. In January 2023, the couple announced the birth of their son (Phoenix Barron Hilton Reum ), born via surrogacy. Reum also has a daughter with former actress Laura Bellizzi, whom he provides for financially.

References 

1981 births
Living people
American company founders
Columbia College (New York) alumni
Place of birth missing (living people)
American businesspeople
American venture capitalists
Conrad Hilton family
Richards family